Elections to Argyll and Bute Council took place on 5 May 2022 on the same day as the 31 other Scottish local government elections. The election will use the 11 wards created under the Local Governance (Scotland) Act 2004, with 36 councillors being elected. Each ward elected either 3 or 4 members, using the STV electoral system.

New ward boundaries were proposed by Boundaries Scotland in 2021 which would have reduced the total number of councillors to 34, however these were rejected by the Scottish Parliament.

At the previous election in 2017, the Scottish National Party (SNP) won the most seats, however a coalition of Conservatives, Liberal Democrats and independents, referred to as The Argyll, Lomond and the Isles Group (TALIG) ran the council.

Background

Previous election
At the previous election in 2017, the Scottish National Party (SNP) became the largest party despite losing two seats, overtaking the number of independents which fell by five. A coalition of independents, Conservatives and Liberal Democrats retained control of the council after the Conservatives made five gains and the Liberal Democrats increased their number by two.

Notes
Votes are the sum of first preference votes across all council wards. The net gain/loss and percentage changes relate to the result of the previous Scottish local elections in May 2012. This is because STV has an element of proportionality which is not present unless multiple seats are being elected. This may differ from other published sources showing gain/loss relative to seats held at dissolution of Scotland's councils.

Source:

Composition
After the 2017 election, a few changes in the composition of the council happened. Changes in the political affiliation of councillors occurred when Conservative councillor Alastair Redman was suspended over Islamophobia allegations and independent councillor Roddy McCuish joined the Independence for Scotland Party. In the run up to the election, Conservative councillor Donald Kelly was deselected by the party but continued on as an independent. Three by-elections were held and resulted in an independent hold, a Conservative gain from the Lib Dems and a Conservative hold.

Retiring councillors

Proposed boundary changes
Following the passing of the Islands (Scotland) Act 2018, a review of the boundaries was undertaken in North Ayrshire, Argyll and Bute, Highland, Orkney Islands, Shetland Islands and Comhairle nan Eilean Siar. The Act allowed single- or two-member wards to be created to provide better representation of island communities. New ward boundaries were proposed by Boundaries Scotland in 2021 which would have increased the number of wards by one to 12 but reduced the number of councillors by two to 34. Two new two-member, island-only wards would have been created to represent Islay, Jura and Colonsay and Mull, Iona, Coll and Tiree. As a result, the Kintyre peninsula would have been represented by a single ward instead of multiple wards which cover a mix of mainland and island communities.

The proposals would have made no changes to the boundaries or numbers of councillors in Cowal; Dunoon and Lomond North. The boundaries in Isle of Bute would have remained the same but the number of councillors would have been reduced from three to two. Minimal changes would have been made to the boundaries of Helensburgh Central and Helensburgh and Lomond South but the number of councillors in Helensburgh Central would have been reduced by one from four to three. Oban would have been placed in its own ward with four members and a new two-member Lorn ward including the inhabited island of Lismore would have been created. However, the proposals in Argyll and Bute were rejected by the Scottish Parliament and the 11 wards created under the Local Governance (Scotland) Act 2004 remained in place.

Results

Ward summary

|- class="unsortable" align="centre"
!rowspan=2 align="left"|Ward
! %
!Cllrs
! %
!Cllrs
! %
!Cllrs
! %
!Cllrs
! %
!Cllrs
! %
!Cllrs
! %
!Cllrs
!rowspan=2|TotalCllrs
|- class="unsortable" align="center"
!colspan=2 bgcolor=""|SNP
!colspan=2 bgcolor=""|Independents
!colspan=2 bgcolor=""|Conservative
!colspan=2 bgcolor=""|Lib Dem
!colspan=2 bgcolor=""|Lab
!colspan=2 bgcolor=""|Green
!colspan=2 bgcolor="white"| Others
|-
|align="left"|South Kintyre
|32.8
|1
|35.9
|1
|22.5
|1
|8.7
|0
|colspan="2" 
|colspan="2" 
|colspan="2" 
|3
|-
|align="left"|Kintyre and the Islands
|29.9
|1
|39.9
|1
|9.6
|0
|16.4
|1
|4.2
|0
|colspan="2" 
|colspan="2" 
|3
|-
|align="left"|Mid Argyll
|31.2
|1
|46.6
|1
|11.6
|1
|3.3
|0
|4.9
|0
|colspan="2" 
|2.4
|0
|3
|-
|align="left"|Oban South and the Isles
|38.2
|2
|29.8
|1
|12.4
|1
|5.2
|0
|4.7
|0
|9.7
|0
|colspan="2" 
|4
|-
|align="left"|Oban North and Lorn
|30.6
|1
|31.6
|1
|18.7
|1
|6.5
|0
|colspan="2" 
|9.7
|1
|2.9
|0
|4
|-
|align="left"|Cowal
|41.9
|1
|5.2
|0
|26.1
|1
|16.8
|1
|7.7
|0
|colspan="2" 
|2.4
|0
|3
|-
|align="left"|Dunoon
|40.9
|1
|16.2
|0
|17.9
|1
|16.9
|1
|6.5
|0
|colspan="2" 
|1.6
|0
|3
|-
|align="left"|Isle of Bute
|25.4
|1
|46.1
|1
|17.8
|1
|1.1
|0
|4.3
|0
|3.0
|0
|2.4
|0
|3
|-
|align="left"|Lomond North
|24.3
|1
|34.1
|1
|26.4
|1
|2.8
|0
|12.4
|0
|colspan="2" 
|colspan="2" 
|3
|-
|align="left"|Helensburgh Central
|21.4
|1
|2.2
|0
|37.1
|1
|11.1
|1
|21.3
|1
|6.8
|0
|colspan="2" 
|4
|-
|align="left"|Helensburgh and Lomond South
|26.0
|1
|colspan="2" 
|47.7
|1
|17.8
|1
|colspan="2" 
|8.6
|0
|colspan="2" 
|3
|- class="unsortable" class="sortbottom"
!align="left"| Total
!31.0
!12
!25.3
!7
!22.7
!10
!9.6
!5
!6.4
!1
!3.9
!1
!1.1
!0
!36
|}

Ward results

South Kintyre

Kintyre and the Islands

Mid Argyll

Oban South and the Isles

Oban North and Lorn

Cowal

Dunoon

Isle of Bute

Lomond North

Helensburgh Central

Helensburgh and Lomond South

Changes since 2022

By-elections since 2022

Kintyre and the Islands

References

Argyll
Argyll and Bute Council elections